KJOL may refer to: 

 KJOL (AM), a radio station (620 AM) licensed to serve Grand Junction, Colorado, United States
 KJOL-FM, a radio station (91.9 FM) licensed to serve Montrose, Colorado